James O'Neill (September 3, 1847June 9, 1929) was an American lawyer, jurist, and Republican politician.  He served 24 years as a Wisconsin circuit court judge in western Wisconsin.  Earlier, he had served one term in the Wisconsin State Assembly, representing Clark County.

Biography
Born in Lisbon, New York, O'Neill went to Lawrence University and later Cornell University where he graduated from in 1871. He taught school and studied law at Albany Law School, graduated in 1873, and was admitted to the New York Bar. In 1873, he moved to Neillsville, Wisconsin at the invitation of his uncle James O'Neill and practiced law. In 1885, he served in the Wisconsin State Assembly as a Republican. O'Neill was appointed District Attorney of Clark County, Wisconsin. He practiced law with Spencer M. Marsh until he was elected Wisconsin Circuit Court judge in 1897 serving until 1922. He died in Neillsville, Wisconsin.

He died on June 9, 1929, and is buried in Neillsville City Cemetery.

References

1847 births
1929 deaths
People from Lisbon, New York
People from Neillsville, Wisconsin
Cornell University alumni
Lawrence University alumni
Albany Law School alumni
New York (state) lawyers
County officials in Wisconsin
Wisconsin state court judges
Burials in Wisconsin
19th-century American lawyers
Republican Party members of the Wisconsin State Assembly